4Gamer.net is a Japanese video game website operated by Aetas Inc. It was launched in August 2000.

The site initially focused on "western games" such as FPS and RTS genres, the video gaming market, along with MMORPGs and dating simulations. Today, 4Gamer.net is a comprehensive video game information site.

It is one of the largest video game websites in Japan. It has been frequently referenced by Famitsu, as well as Western video game sites including IGN, GameTrailers, Eurogamer and 1Up.com.

Notes

External links 
 

Internet properties established in 2000
Web portals
Japanese entertainment websites
Video game websites